The 27th Arabian Gulf Cup will be the 27th edition of the biennial football competition for the eight members of the Arab Gulf Cup Football Federation. The tournament will be held in Oman in December 2025.

Teams

Group stage

Group A

Group B

Knockout stage
In the knockout stage, extra time and penalty shoot-out are used to decide the winner if necessary.

Bracket

Semi-finals

Final

References

Arabian Gulf Cup
2025 in Asian football
International association football competitions hosted by Oman
December 2025 sports events in Asia